Arthur Turner (13 January 1920 – 28 October 2005) was an Australian rules footballer who played for the South Melbourne Football Club in the Victorian Football League (VFL).

Notes

External links 

1920 births
2005 deaths
Australian rules footballers from Victoria (Australia)
Sydney Swans players